Umair Haque is a British economist. He was the director of the Havas Media Lab, has previously blogged in the Harvard Business Review and is author of the book The New Capitalist Manifesto: Building a Disruptively Better Business. The book sets the "incumbent" capitalists of the 20th century against the 21st "insurgents" and states that the latter are creating a more sustainable "new capitalism".

Personal life
Haque is the son of Pakistani economist Nadeem Haque. He graduated from McGill with a degree in neuroscience and got an MBA from the London Business School.

Bibliography

References

External links
 Haque contributed articles to the Harvard Business Review blog
https://www.amazon.com/Umair-Haque/e/B003UQSSZA%3Fref=dbs_a_mng_rwt_scns_share 
https://vimeo.com/havasmedialabs

American bloggers
American business writers
American business theorists
Business speakers
Year of birth missing (living people)
Living people